Aplastodiscus albofrenatus is a species of frog in the family Hylidae, endemic to Brazil.
Its natural habitats are subtropical or tropical moist lowland forests, rivers, plantations, rural gardens, and heavily degraded former forests. It is threatened by habitat loss.

References

Aplastodiscus
Endemic fauna of Brazil
Amphibians described in 1924
Taxonomy articles created by Polbot